Modern Judaism is a peer reviewed academic journal of Jewish studies. It is published by Oxford University Press.

The editor is professor Steven T. Katz of the Elie Wiesel Center for Judaic Studies at Boston University.

References 

Oxford University Press academic journals
Judaic studies journals